Inuvil is a village in Northern Sri Lanka. It is situated along the KKS main road, Jaffna district. The area is mainly populated by people who speak the Tamil (see Portuguese Ceylon).

People 
The town and the surrounding area has traditionally been populated by farmers. However, many have educated their children to be professionals. There are several people who have started their own business as well. The majority of the people are Tamils. First revolutionary group (EROS) Eelam Revolutionary Organisation of Students formed by Eliyathamby Ratnasabapathy is from Inuvil.

Many residents have immigrated to western countries. The Inuvil diaspora is present in Canada, England, France, Germany, Switzerland, United States, Australia, Norway and Sweden.

Education
Inuvil Central College 
Inuvil Hindu College 
There are few Computer Education centers, too.
Inuvil Public Library IT Center (Nenasala)

Diaspora Organizations

Inuvil Thiruvoor Ontriam - Canada 
Inuvil Thiruvoor Ontriam - Canada is a non-profit Tamil organization created by the Inuvil diaspora living in Toronto started in the year 2000 to bring together all diaspora and their children for reunification in Toronto. Inuvil Thiruvoor Ontriam creates academic level Tamil language competitions, art shows, Bharata Natyam shows based on the Tamil culture and summer Barbecues yearly to bring gatherings of Tamil diaspora from Inuvil living in the province of Ontario. The organization creates charities to help with the war-torn development in Sri Lanka for orphanages, resettlement and community development in Sri Lanka and Canada. Inuvil Thiruvoor Onrium keeps in touch with organizations like the National Council of Canadian Tamils and Canadian Tamil Congress to keep networked connections for its resources in charity and development projects in Sri Lanka. Inuvil Thiruvoor Ontriam plays an active role in the Tamil Canadians community living in the Greater Toronto Area, Brampton, Mississauga, Pickering, Ontario, Ajax, Ontario, Oshawa, Ontario and Whitby, Ontario.

Culture 
Most of them are Hindus Around 98–99% and follow Tamil Culture. There are many professional drummers who came from this village including famous Thadshanamoorthy. There is also a "Gurukulam" where most of the Hindu priests are educated here.

Famous Hindu temples(இந்து கோயில்கள்) 
In the village of Inuvil there are many temples. There are few huge historical Tamil kingdom era's temples. These are still being well maintained by the people. The large temples in Inuvil are:
Inuvai Pararajasekara pillaiyaar kovil(இணுவை பரராஜசேகரப்பிள்ளையார் கோவில்),
Inuvai Kanthaswamy kovil (இணுவை கந்தசாமி கோவில்)
Inuvai Sivakami amman kovil(இணுவை சிவகாமி அம்மன் கோவில்)
Inuvai Karaikal sivan kovil (இணுவை காரைக்கால் சிவன் கோவில்)
Inuvil Segarajasekarap Pilliar Kovil
Inuvil Manchathdy Murugan Kovil

Transport
Inuvil Railway Station

Notable people 

 Srikanthalakshmi Arulanandam

References 

Villages in Jaffna District
Valikamam South DS Division